In Waves is the fifth studio album by American heavy metal band Trivium. It was released worldwide on various dates August 2, 2011, and August 9, 2011, through Roadrunner Records and was produced by Colin Richardson and Martyn "Ginge" Ford.

Background and promotion
It is the first album to feature second drummer Nick Augusto and the first without original drummer Travis Smith. The first single from the band, "In Waves", was released on May 21, 2011, to Trivium World members. Following this on June 6, 2011, Matt Heafy stated on his Twitter that the album would be named after the aforementioned song. The single was most recently released onto the US iTunes Store & Zune Marketplace on June 10.

On June 17, the music video for "In Waves" was released.

On June 19, Trivium performed "In Waves", "Black" and "Dusk Dismantled" at their show in Birmingham, United Kingdom. It was the first time "In Waves" was played live and the first time "Black" and "Dusk Dismantled" had been heard by fans.

On June 26, Paolo told his Twitter followers to tweet to Roadrunner Records to release the song "Dusk Dismantled". On June 28, the song was released exclusively to TriviumWorld members with an announcement that it'll be released to the official Trivium YouTube page on June 29.

On July 9, Trivium played "Inception of the End" live for the first time at the Rockstar Mayhem Festival in San Bernardino, CA. Not only was it the first time the song had been played live, but it was also the first time the song had been heard by fans. On July 13, Trivium released "Inception of the End" with the song premiering on HotTopic.com.
On July 21, both "Black" and "Built to Fall" premiered on various radio stations including their hometown station WJRR.com and 98online.com.

On their 2011 run on the Mayhem Festival tour, Matt Heafy stated that "Built to Fall" would be their first radio single, and the live debut of "Caustic Are the Ties That Bind" was played in San Francisco supporting Dream Theater.

The music video for "Built to Fall" is released on the October 28, 2011, after a series of image and video teasers released over Facebook and YouTube, while TriviumWorld members could view the video two days earlier.

A lyric video for "Black" has been released in January 2012.

On November 16, 2012, a music video for the single "Watch the World Burn" was released. It features various amounts of live and backstage footage while touring for In Waves. It also features footage from the live recording at Chapman Studios, which was directed by Ramon Boutviseth.

Composition
The album featured a sound closer to Ascendancy than The Crusade and Shogun and features their more traditional heavy metal and metalcore sound than thrash metal. Nick Augusto's drum work features blast beats in tracks "Inception of the End", "Forsake Not the Dream", "Chaos Reigns" and "Shattering the Skies Above".

Critical reception

In Waves has received generally positive reviews, averaging a score of 66 based on 13 reviewers on the review-aggregating website Metacritic.

Eduardo Rivadavia of AllMusic rated the album four out of five stars and commented, "...Trivium will probably be vilified once again for taking the same sort of creative backward step that the fans typically clamor for from Metallica, Slayer, and other bands on down; it's the essence of the Florida band's "can't win" lot in life, but there's always hope that this will change, in time".
Another positive review came from Ian Winwood of BBC Music, in his review, he stated, "...This may not be quite enough for Trivium to turn back the hands of the clock to the point where the world lay at their fretboards, but the notion that this is a band whose best days lie behind them is one that, at least for now, is resting on ice". AltSounds also spoke positively about the album and even after stating "Trivium have not topped themselves" in reference to their past albums but did call it "...a symbol of triumph and overall a sound, beautifully solid record."

Revolver rated the album three out of five stars and summarized, "An inconsistent record with flashes of brilliance, In Waves should, however, keep diehard Trivium fans happy."

Despite mostly positive reception, the album was poorly received by Jamie Thomson from The Guardian, who, in his review, stated that, "In Waves is as overproduced and mercilessly polished as modern metal gets, and all the worse for it."

Commercial performance
In Waves sold 22,000 copies in its first week of release and debuted at No. 13 on the Billboard 200 and at No. 1 on the Billboard Hard Rock charts, making it the highest charting record Trivium has released to date. In Canada, the album debuted at No. 32 on the Canadian Albums Chart. The album also charted in the UK at No. 17 on the UK Top 40 albums chart, No. 6 in Japan and No. 8 in Germany. In Waves has sold 81,000 copies in the United States as of 2013.

Track listing

Personnel
Trivium
 Matt Heafy – lead vocals, guitars
 Corey Beaulieu – guitars, backing vocals, gang vocals on "Shattering the Skies Above"
 Paolo Gregoletto – bass, backing vocals, gang vocals on "Shattering the Skies Above"
 Nick Augusto – drums, percussion

Production
 Produced by Colin Richardson and Martyn "Ginge" Ford
 Engineered by Carl Bown
 Mastered by Ted Jensen

Charts

Release history

References 

2011 albums
Trivium (band) albums
Roadrunner Records albums
Albums produced by Colin Richardson